"The One with the Morning After" is the sixteenth episode of the third season of the American television situation comedy Friends and 64th overall, which aired on NBC on February 20, 1997. The plot, which is darker than most Friends episodes, centers on Ross (David Schwimmer) dealing with the repercussions of sleeping with another woman hours after he and Rachel (Jennifer Aniston) had broken up.

The episode was written by the show's creators, David Crane and Marta Kauffman, directed by James Burrows, and guest-stars James Michael Tyler as Gunther, and Angela Featherstone as Chloe, the girl from the Xerox shop 
whom Ross ends up sleeping with after looking for comfort when he and Rachel made the decision to take a break from their relationship in the previous episode.

Plot 
The morning after Ross and Rachel take a break from their relationship, Ross wakes up in his apartment to Chloe (Angela Featherstone) walking out of his bathroom, insinuating that they spent the night together. Hurriedly, checking his answering machine for messages, Ross realizes that Rachel had left a message apologizing, saying that she loved him, and that she was going to drop by his apartment. Unable to get rid of Chloe in time, he hides her behind the door as Rachel comes by to try things again. Ross quickly agrees and becomes her boyfriend again.

Not wasting any time, Ross goes over to Joey (Matt LeBlanc) and Chandler's (Matthew Perry) apartment to confess what he did. While Ross believes that he should tell Rachel everything, Joey and Chandler urge him not to. After reluctantly agreeing, the guys then try to figure out a way so that Rachel does not find out about Ross and Chloe on her own. Joey then tells Ross that he needs to think about 'the trail', which is the list of people between the girl he slept with, and the girl he does not want to find out what happened. Chandler traces the trail from Chloe to her coworker Isaac, who has a sister Jasmine, who works with Phoebe, who is best friends with Rachel.

As Ross goes down 'the trail' to prevent the news from getting to Rachel, he finds out that Chloe had already told Isaac, who had already told his sister Jasmine. While talking to Jasmine, he manages to get her to promise to not say anything to Phoebe. But, she mentions that he should talk to her roommate that she told, because her roommate knows Rachel, too. Who just so happens to be none other than Gunther (James Michael Tyler). Ross rushes to Central Perk to try to keep Gunther quiet, only to find out that Gunther had already told Rachel everything.

Meanwhile, Monica (Courteney Cox) and Phoebe (Lisa Kudrow) are back in Monica's bedroom trying a new waxing product they purchased called Waxine, but the pain is too great. Hearing the screams from across the hall, Joey and Chandler rush to their rescue. But, before they can leave the room, an angry Rachel storms into the apartment, followed by Ross. Monica, Phoebe, Chandler, and Joey stay in the bedroom, unbeknownst to Ross and Rachel.

The fight between Ross and Rachel is even worse than the night before when they took a break from their relationship. Rachel gets even angrier with Ross as he tries to talk to her and settle things between the two of them. She is upset that she had to hear everything that happened between Ross and Chloe from Gunther, and she gets furious when Ross accidentally lets slip out that Chloe was still in his apartment when Rachel had come over to get back together earlier that morning. Rachel then tries to make Ross see her perspective by mocking him and creating a scenario where she sleeps with another man. Chandler and Joey want to leave, but Ross tells Rachel he was planning on tell her everything but Chandler and Joey told him not to. Humiliated, the boys decide not to leave the bedroom, but the four friends get so hungry that they eat the Waxine, which happens to be organic, but not edible.

At 3:00 a.m., Ross is still trying to get Rachel to forgive him. Just as it seems as though Rachel might forgive him, Ross starts touching her and kissing her, but she stands up and slaps his hands away, telling him to go home. Suddenly, Ross walks over to her and tries again to tell her that they can work past this. He then tells her that he cannot imagine his life without her. Both start to cry as Ross gets down on his knees and begs for forgiveness. Rachel refuses, telling him that she cannot forgive him because she cannot stop picturing Ross with Chloe and that there is nothing he can say or do, because it has changed everything between them forever. The two sadly part, leaving Ross devastated and saying "This can't be it." To which Rachel wonders, "Then how come it is?"

The episode ends with the other four finally being able to get out of the bedroom and find Rachel on the couch, and Ross nowhere to be seen. Monica wraps a blanket over Rachel as the other three quietly cross the room to go to their respective homes.

Cast and crew

Main cast 
Jennifer Aniston as Rachel Green
Courteney Cox as Monica Geller
Lisa Kudrow as Phoebe Buffay
Matt LeBlanc as Joey Tribbiani
Matthew Perry as Chandler Bing
David Schwimmer as Ross Geller

Guest stars 
Angela Featherstone as Chloe: the girl from the copy place that Ross sleeps with after him and Rachel took a break from their relationship in the previous episode.
James Michael Tyler as Gunther: the manager of the Central Perk coffee house where the gang spends their free time, who also happens to be in love with Rachel.
Maury Ginsberg as Isaac: Chloe's coworker at the copy place.
Cynthia Mann as Jasmine: Isaac's sister, who also happens to be Phoebe's coworker and Gunther's roommate.

Crew 
James Burrows (director)
Marta Kauffman and David Crane (writers)

Reception 
In an interview, Aniston mentions the infamous breakup stating, "The breakup. Well, that was sort of the beginning of the end for them. Or, the beginning of the beginnings of endings and beginnings." It was the episode in which the show's dynamic had completely changed, and had left audiences more anxious for the next episode because more was at stake in terms of character and plot development. In the show's Blu-ray and DVD commentary track, the show's co-creators Marta Kauffman and David Crane, along with producing partner Kevin S. Bright, discussed the difficulties of trying to make this episode both dramatic and comedic. Part of this was due to Aniston's performance as Rachel being a little too realistic, and the situation of the breakup being too excruciatingly familiar. According to Kauffman, "Nearly every adult watching this episode would've had some kind of personal memory of a similarly awful split". This is also the episode where someone utters for the first time the classic saying, "we were on a break", which is later said as an ongoing gag throughout the rest of the series.

References

External links 

 
 "The One with the Morning After" on TV.com

Friends (season 3) episodes
1997 American television episodes
Television episodes directed by James Burrows